Neoterebra intumescyra is a species of sea snail, a marine gastropod mollusk in the family Terebridae, the auger snails.

Description

Distribution

References

 Lima, S. F. B.; Tenório, D. O.; Barros, J. C. N. (2007). New species of Brazilian deep-water Terebra (Caenogastropoda: Terebridae) with the first record of Terebra colombiensis Simone & Gracia, 2006 for the southwestern Atlantic. Miscellanea Malacologica. 2(4), 63-72

External links
 Fedosov, A. E.; Malcolm, G.; Terryn, Y.; Gorson, J.; Modica, M. V.; Holford, M.; Puillandre, N. (2020). Phylogenetic classification of the family Terebridae (Neogastropoda: Conoidea). Journal of Molluscan Studies

Terebridae
Gastropods described in 2007